Joo In-young is a South Korean actress. She is known for roles in dramas such as It's Okay to Not Be Okay, The Devil Judge, When I Was the Most Beautiful, Mother of Mine and The One and Only. She also appeared in movies A Reason to Live, The Bacchus Lady and Decision to Leave.

Personal life
Joo is married and has one son.

Filmography

Television series

Film

Theatre

Awards and nominations

References

External links 
 
 

1978 births
Living people
21st-century South Korean actresses
South Korean television actresses
South Korean film actresses